Diaziridines are heterocyclic compounds containing two nitrogen atoms in a three-membered ring. They can be considered as strained hydrazines. Unlike most amine types of structures, the nitrogen atoms of diaziridines are configurationally stable because the ring strain prevents Walden inversion. As a result, there can be various stereoisomeric forms of this structure.

They are usually synthesized by treating a carbonyl compound with an aminating reagent like hydroxylamine-O-sulfonic acid and either ammonia or a primary aliphatic amine under slightly basic conditions. The final step is based on the intramolecular cyclization of an aminal.

Reactions
 Unsubstituted diaziridines are often directly oxidized (I2/NEt3) to the more stable diazirines.
 They can undergo ring expansion reaction with electrophilic reagents like ketenes or isocyanates.
 Some derivatives have neurologic activity.

References

Nitrogen heterocycles
Heterocyclic compounds with 1 ring
Three-membered rings